The Party for Civic and Patriotic Action (PACP) is a political party in Mali founded by Yeah Samake and his followers. The PACP charter (Samake's party) emphasizes the values of patriotism, citizenship, decentralization, freedom, democracy, human rights, and good governance.

References

"BYU alumnus to run for President of Mali"
"NIANKORO YEAH SAMAKE, PORTE-DRAPEAU DU PACP"

External links
Yeah Samake Campaign Website French (Official)

Political parties in Mali